Haskell-class attack transports (APA) were amphibious assault ships of the United States Navy created in 1944.  They were designed to transport 1,500 troops and their combat equipment, and land them on hostile shores with the ships' integral landing craft.
  
The Haskells were very active in the World War II Pacific Theater of Operations, landing Marines and Army troops and transporting casualties at Iwo Jima and Okinawa. Ships of the class were among the first Allied ships to enter Tokyo Bay at the end of World War II, landing the first occupation troops at Yokosuka.  After the end of World War II, most participated in Operation Magic Carpet, the massive sealift of US personnel back to the United States.  A few of the Haskell class were reactivated for the Korean War, with some staying in service into the Vietnam War. 

The Haskell class, Maritime Commission standard type VC2-S-AP5, is a sub‑type of the World War II Victory ship design.  117 were launched in 1944 and 1945, with 14 more being finished as another VC2 type or canceled. Built by the War Shipping Administration under the Emergency Shipbuilding program.

Design
The VC2-S-AP5 design was intended for the transport and assault landing of over 1,500 troops and their heavy combat equipment.  During Operation Magic Carpet, up to 1,900 personnel per ship were carried homeward.

The Haskells carried 25 landing craft to deliver the troops and equipment right onto the beach. The 23 main boats were the -long LCVP. The LCVP was designed to carry 36 equipped troops.  The other two landing craft were the -long LCM (3), capable of carrying 60 troops or 30 tons (27 t) of cargo, or the  LCM (6).  They also carried one gig.

The Haskell-class ships were armed with one 5"/38 caliber gun, twelve Bofors 40 mm L/60 guns (one quad mount, four dual mounts), and ten Oerlikon 20 mm guns.

Ships of the Haskell class

Haskell-class attack transports included APA-117, the lead ship, through APA-247, the never completed USS Mecklenburg. The hulls for APA-181 through APA-186 were repurposed to be hospital ships before they were named. Ultimately those hospital ships were built on larger C4 plan and the six VC2 hulls were built in a merchant configuration. APA-240 through APA-247 were named, but cancelled in 1945 when the war ended.

Fate
Most of the Haskell-class ships were mothballed in 1946, with only a few remaining in service.  Many of the Haskell class were scrapped in 1973–75.  A few were converted into Missile Range Instrumentation Ships.

, the last remaining ship in the Haskell configuration, was scrapped in 2009 at ESCO Marine, in Brownsville, Tx.
, which was converted and renamed , lasted until she was scrapped in 2012.
SS Rutland Victory was sold to a private company and sank on February 13, 1976 600 miles East of Tokyo, Japan.

Notable incidents
  had Kamikaze attack damage on 1 April 1945 at Okinawa. Over 15 men were killed. The extensive engine room damage was later repaired.
  on 13 August 1945 damaged in last kamikaze attack of WW2, 21 sailors killed and 89 wounded. 
   had mine damage on 17 September 1945, off Okinawa, this caused the death of three men and damaged the ship extensively.
  on 2 April 1945 was hit by kamikaze attack, the plane hit the side of the ship then dropped into the sea. She was later repaired.

In fiction
The 1956 movie Away All Boats presents operations on an attack transport.  It was based on a popular novel of the same name, written by an officer who served on one during World War 2.

The opening chapters of the novel "Cinderella Liberty" were set on the APA USS Begonia.

See also
 Victory ship
Gilliam-class attack transport

Notes

References
Class information in Hazegray/DANFS APA-125 page
MARAD National Defense Reserve Fleet "Current Inventory"

External links
 US Naval Historical Center Photo Library – APA List by Hull Number
 MARAD Records for Haskell class
 Ship Model and Blueprints for Haskell class